Pierre-Luc Séguillon (13 September 1940 – 31 October 2010) was a French columnist and journalist.

References 

1940 births
2010 deaths
Chevaliers of the Légion d'honneur
Writers from Nancy, France
French columnists
French television journalists
Deaths from lung cancer in France